Paul Donnelly (born c. 1968/69) is an Irish Sinn Féin politician who has been a Teachta Dála (TD) for the Dublin West constituency since the 2020 general election.

He served as a member of Fingal County Council from 2014 to 2020. He had contested three general elections and three by-elections prior to winning a seat in 2020. He topped the poll in the Dublin West constituency at the 2020 general election, coming ahead of the sitting Taoiseach Leo Varadkar. Aaron O'Rourke was co-opted to Donnelly's seat on Fingal County Council following his election to the Dáil.

Personal life
Donnelly lives in Clonsilla with his wife Angela and four children.

References

External links
Paul Donnelly’s page on the Sinn Féin website

Living people
Members of the 33rd Dáil
Sinn Féin TDs (post-1923)
Year of birth missing (living people)